The 2018 Liga 3 North Maluku is the fourth edition of Liga 3 North Maluku as a qualifying round for the national round of 2018 Liga 3. Persiter Ternate are the defending champions.

Teams
Only 2 clubs which will participate the league in this season

References 

2018 in Indonesian football
North Maluku
Liga 3 (Indonesia)